This article presents top ten lists of male singles tennis players, as ranked by various official and non-official ranking authorities throughout the history of the sport.

The article is split into two sections: 1912–1972, and since 1973 when the first official ATP rankings were published, for ease of navigation.

Top ten rankings by year

1912–1972

1973

1974

1975

1976

1977

1978

1979

1980

1981

1982

1983

1984

1985

1986

1987

1988

1989 

 Last Tingay ranking before his death.

1990

1991

1992

1993

1994

1995

1996

1997

1998

1999

2000

2001

2002

2003

2004

2005

2006

2007

2008

2009

2010

2011

2012

2013

2014

2015

2016

2017

2018

2019

2020

2021

2022

See also 
 
 
 World number 1 ranked male tennis players
 List of ATP number 1 ranked singles tennis players
 Top ten ranked female tennis players
 Top ten ranked female tennis players (1921–1974)

Notes

References 

Men's tennis
10
10